The University of Victoria (UVic) is a public research university located in the municipalities of Oak Bay and Saanich, British Columbia, Canada.

History
The University of Victoria is the oldest post-secondary institution in British Columbia. First established in 1903 as Victoria College, an affiliated college of McGill University, it gained full autonomy and degree-granting status through a charter on July 1, 1963. 

Between 1903 and 1915, Victoria College offered first- and second-year McGill courses in the arts and sciences. Administered locally by the Victoria School Board, the college was an adjunct to Victoria High School and shared its facilities. Both institutions were under the direction of a single Principal: E.B. Paul, 1903–1908; and S.J. Willis, 1908–1915.

The 1915 opening of the University of British Columbia, established by Act of Legislature in 1908, obliged the college to suspend operations in higher education in Victoria.  In 1920, as a result of local demands, Victoria College began the second stage of its development, reborn in affiliation with the University of British Columbia. Though still administered by the Victoria School Board, the college was now completely separate from Victoria High School, moving in 1921 into Craigdarroch Castle. Over the next two decades, under Principals E.B. Paul and P.H. Elliott, Victoria College provided courses in first- and second-year arts and sciences. It was also during this period that future author Pierre Berton edited and served as principal cartoonist for the student newsletter, The Microscope. Between  1921 and 1944, enrolment at Victoria College did not often reach above 250. However, in 1945, 128 servicemen returning from World War II pushed enrolment up to 400, and 600 in 1946.

The final stage, between the years 1945 and 1963, saw the transition from two-year college to university, under Principals J.M. Ewing and W.H. Hickman.
During this period, the college was governed by the Victoria College Council, representative of the parent University of British Columbia, the Greater Victoria School Board, and the provincial Department of Education. In 1946 the college was forced by postwar enrolment to move from Craigdarroch to the Lansdowne campus of the Provincial Normal School, the current location of Camosun College's Lansdowne Campus. The Normal School joined Victoria College in 1956 as its Faculty of Education. Late in this transitional period (through the co-operation of the Department of National Defence and the Hudson's Bay Company) the 284-acre (1,1 km2)--now 385-acre (1.6 km2)--campus at Gordon Head was acquired. In 1961 the college, still in affiliation with UBC, awarded its first bachelor's degrees.

In the early part of this century, professional education expanded beyond the traditional fields of theology, law and medicine. Graduate training based on the German-inspired American model of specialized course work and the completion of a research thesis was introduced. The policy of university education initiated in the 1960s responded to population pressure and the belief that higher education was a key to social justice and economic productivity for individuals and for society.

The university gained its full autonomy in 1963 as the University of Victoria. The University Act of 1963 vested administrative authority in a chancellor elected by the convocation of the university, a board of governors, and a president appointed by the board; academic authority was given to the senate which was representative both of the faculties and of the convocation.

The university's Arms were registered with the Canadian Heraldic Authority on April 3, 2001. The historical traditions of the university are reflected in the coat of arms, its academic regalia, and its house flag. The BA hood is solid red, recalling the early affiliation with McGill, along with the martlets in the coat of arms. The BSc hood, of gold, and the BEd hood, of blue, show the colours of the University of British Columbia. Blue and gold have been retained as the official colours. The motto at the top of the Arms, in Hebrew characters, is "Let there be Light"; the motto at the bottom, in Latin, is "A Multitude of the Wise is the Health of the World."

Department of Political Science Chilly Climate Report
On May 11, 1992, the Department of Political Science created the committee to Make the Department More Supportive to Women as a response to concerns regarding experiences of graduate and undergraduate students. The committee was made up of five female undergraduate students and Dr. Somer Brodribb, an untenured professor working in the department. Later, this committee was unofficially called the "Chilly Climate" or Climate Committee within the department. "Chilly Climate" is a term used by the Project on the Status and Education of Women. 
A preliminary report published by the Climate Committee to the Department of Political Science on March 23, 1993, which looked at the experience of both faculty and students at University of Victoria issued recommendations that, in their eyes, would make the department more hospitable to female students while also highlighting the experiences of female students which the committee found troubling. These recommendations included the establishment of a committee for addressing issues that were raised in the report, the creation of formal policies addressing race and gender discrimination, and workshops for faculty on race and gender issues in the classroom environment. Notably, the preliminary report also highlighted the importance of including classroom content from feminist perspectives and more texts authored by female scholars.

In response to this report, the tenured professors of political science department Robert Bedeski, Colin Bennett, Ron Cheffins, Warren Magusson, Terry Morley, Norman Ruff, Rob Walker, and Jeremy Wilson challenged what they perceived to be slander from Dr. Brodribb, who chaired the committee. They requested that Dr. Brodribb allow an investigation into the allegations of sexist behaviour in the Chilly Climate report. Dr. Bodribb refused, stating that this went against the agreement her committee made with the women interviewed and could expose them to further discrimination. If the evidence was not handed over the tenured professors requested a complete withdrawal of the statements made in the Chilly Climate report and an apology that would be distributed to all those who saw the report. They also mentioned seeking further action if Dr. Brodribb did neither of these things. To review documents related to the report, one can go to the University of Victoria Libraries Special Collections.

A review committee was established by University of Victoria President David Strong, requesting advice from lawyers Beth Bilson and Thomas R. Berger to assist in evaluating the climate of the political science department. They published a report in August 1993, which included recommendations that University of Victoria President David Strong later endorsed.

Campus and grounds

The campus is situated 7 km north of downtown Victoria and is spread over 403 acres. UVic also has an offsite study center at the Jeanne S. Simpson Field Studies Resource Center in Lake Cowichan. Despite its name, no part of the university's main campus is located in the City of Victoria proper, instead split between the municipalities of Saanich and Oak Bay. The campus is several hundred feet from the Pacific Ocean at Cadboro Bay. The six-hectare Queenswood campus was acquired from the Sisters of St. Ann and converted into a national laboratory. The Legacy Art Gallery on Yates Street and a proposed redevelopment on Broad Street make up the properties owned by the university in downtown Victoria.

The University of Victoria's campus was originally designed by American architectural firm Wurster, Bernardi & Emmons, which had previously achieved fame for having completed major buildings at Stanford University and UC Berkeley. The principles and concept of the original design are still being followed, with the academic portions of the campus located inside the Ring Road, forming a perfect circle  in diameter.

The following is a list of prominent buildings on the University of Victoria campus:

Michael Williams Building – Formerly known as the Administrative Services Building. Accommodates the university's executive team as well as other administrative functions such as accounting, research services, pension, and payroll.
World War II Army Facilities – Nine single-storey, wood-frame utilitarian hut facilities from the Second World War (1940) on the northern part of the University of Victoria campus. These structures are retained for their historical significance and are listed on the Registry of Historic Places of Canada
Bob Wright Centre – Home to the School of Earth & Ocean Sciences, the Department of Chemistry, and the Canadian Centre for Climate Modelling & Analysis (CCCMA). Also features the Department of Astronomy dome and telescopes, lecture theatres, offices, meeting rooms, labs, and SciCafe dining outlet.
Business and Economics Building – Besides the obvious, the Business and Economics building also houses the offices of senior university administrators and contains a student computing facility.
Campus Security Services – Security Officers patrol and respond to Campus needs, provide first aid, and maintain a safe campus. The office also contains parking services, emergency planning, and lost & found.

Campus Services Building – Includes Career Services, the UVic Bookstore, the Computer Store, the Centre for Accessible Learning, and a Starbucks.
Clearihue Building – Organized around a central court (or quadrangle), it is home to the Faculty of Humanities, houses the Departments of English, French, Germanic and Slavic Studies, Greek and Roman Studies, Hispanic and Italian Studies, History, Linguistics, Medieval Studies, Pacific and Asian Studies, Philosophy, and Gender Studies. Contains numerous classrooms as well as student computing facilities, including the Computer Assisted Language Learning (CALL) facility and the Computer Help Desk. It is the location of the Department of University Systems, which is largely responsible for the systems, networking and support of the university, including student computing facilities and language labs. Clearihue is the oldest building on campus, originally constructed in 1962 and augmented by an addition in 1971. It is named after Joseph Clearihue, who was chairman of Victoria College from 1947 until it gained university status in 1963. In 2013, the Clearihue Building underwent a major $15 million redevelopment. Recognizable across campus for its clock tower, the Clearihue clock is notoriously stuck at 1:55 (pictured).
Cornett Building – A sprawling complex of different courts and staircases, which includes classrooms and houses the Departments of Anthropology, Psychology, and Sociology. The Cornett Building is often described by freshmen undergraduates as being an unrelenting maze.

Cunningham – Contains the Department of Biology, the Centre for Forest Biology, a herbarium, and numerous specialized research facilities.
CARSA Building – CARSA is the new Centre for Athletics, Recreation and Special Abilities on the UVic campus. It houses the UVic Vikes athletics and recreation programs, as well as offices, labs and a machine shop for CanAssist, which develops customized technologies, programs and services for people living with disabilities.
David Strong Building – Contains classroom spaces, including seminar rooms, breakout rooms, and the Mathews and McQueen auditorium.
David Turpin Building – The David Turpin Building is best known as the home of the UVic Department of Political Science, one of the largest and best known faculties at the University of Victoria. The building also includes the School of Environmental Studies, Statistics, and Mathematics. The Turpin Building also hosts the government-funded Water & Climate Impacts Research Centre (W-CIRC). It includes a grass roof and high-quality LEED energy efficient engineering.
Elliott – Includes the Departments of Chemistry and Physics and Astronomy, as well as a number of offices, classrooms, and laboratories. The building is topped by the Climenhaga Observatory.
Engineering Buildings – Includes the Engineering Office Wing (EOW), the Engineering Lab Wing (ELW) and the Engineering/Computer Science building (ECS). Home to the Faculty of Engineering and Computer Science, which includes the Departments of Biomedical Engineering, Civil Engineering, Computer Science, Electrical and Computer Engineering, Mechanical Engineering and Software engineering.
Fine Arts – Contains the departments of Writing and History in Art as well as many offices, classrooms, a major lecture theatre, a photography darkroom, Arts Place dining outlet, and a multi-purpose lobby that may be used for readings and performances.

First Peoples House – Anthropological building that provides for Indigenous students. Features two large statues in front of the modern, glass building. It is located between Centre Quadrangle and West Quad.
Fraser Building – Formerly known as the Begbie Building. Houses the Faculty of Law and the Institute for Dispute Resolution. The building also contains classrooms, seminar rooms, a moot courtroom, and the Diana M. Priestly Law Library.
Halpern Centre for Graduate Students – Colloquially known as "The Grad Centre", the building houses the Graduate Student Society (GSS) general office, the "Grad House" restaurant, which is open to the public, and the David Clode lounge. There is also a meeting space (boardroom) that can be booked by contacting the GSS Office.
Hickman Building – Formerly called the Centre for Innovative Teaching. Includes "Smart" classrooms featuring closed-circuit cameras and remote projection systems to link teachers and students with classrooms at remote locations.
Human and Social Development Building – Classrooms and offices for Child and Youth Care, Dispute Resolution, Health Information Science, Indigenous Governance, Nursing, Public Administration, and Social Work.
Ian Stewart Complex – A former recreational facility containing tennis courts, squash/racquetball courts, an outdoor pool, a dance studio, a physiotherapy clinic, a gym, and a weight room. Only the ice rink remains in use, as other services have moved to McKinnon and CARSA. Also contains the Alumni Services, Development, Corporate Relations, and Advancement Services departments. Currently being redeveloped as part of a major expansion to house more post-graduates and international students.
MacLaurin Building – An extensive modernist complex which includes the Faculty of Education and School of Music, as well classrooms, the David Lam Auditorium, the Curriculum Library, and Mac's Bistro.
McKinnon Building – Encompasses the School of Exercise Science, Physical and Health Education, an indoor swimming pool, fitness and weight room, dance studio, outdoor tennis courts, squash courts and a gymnasium.
McPherson Library and William C. Mearns Centre for Learning - The McPherson Library is the major research library of the University of Victoria. It houses the university's extensive holdings, including the university archives, special collections, and map library. Following a major donation, the 2008 expansion to the McPherson Library created the William C. Mearns Centre for Learning, which contains the state-of-the-art Learning Commons, Media Commons, International Centre, classrooms, and several group study rooms.
Medical Sciences Building – The home of the Island Medical Program and future home of the University of Victoria Medical School. 
Petch Building – Houses the Department of Microbiology and Biochemistry and the School of Earth and Ocean Sciences.
Phoenix Theatre – A major academic building notably located outside of Ring Road, it serves as the home of Theatre department and includes many offices and classrooms. It has two theatre stages; the Chief Dan George, and the Roger Bishop. 
Sedgewick – An Advanced Research Complex which houses the Centre for Asia-Pacific Initiatives (CAPI), Centre on Aging, Centre for the Study of Religion in Society, Centre for Global Studies; as well as fundraising and administration offices.
Student Union Building – Popularly known as the "SUB", it houses a movie theatre, restaurants, a stationary store, several book vendors, and the headquarters of several clubs, societies, and campus organizations, including the University of Victoria radio station (CFUV). There is also a large student bar located in the SUB, known as Felicita's Campus Pub.
Jamie Cassels Centre – Formerly known as University Centre and renamed in 2020 after departing President Jamie Cassels. Adjacent to the West Quad, the Centre is a major complex with a distinctive copper roof. It includes the Registrar's Offices, as well as many administrative departments (e.g., Admissions, Accounting, Payroll, Academic Advising, Career Services), the main public restaurant, and the Farquhar auditorium.

The university offers on-campus housing for over 3,200 students. A variety of housing is available, including single and double dormitories, Cluster Housing (apartment-style housing with four people per unit), bachelor and one-bedroom apartments, and family housing. Four buildings in one of the oldest residential complexes at the university are named for Emily Carr, Arthur Currie, Margaret Newton, and David Thompson. Construction on the South Tower Complex was completed in January 2011. The largest residence building in terms of capacity is Ring Road Hall, which holds 294 beds and is split into three wings. The campus has become increasingly cycling-friendly.

Much of the university estate and endowment lands have been preserved as a nature setting, notably Finnerty Gardens and Mystic Vale, a  forested area and park. The large campus is home to deer, owls, ravens, squirrels and many other wild animals native to the area. A large population of domestic rabbits was previously a feature of the campus. In May 2010, the university began trapping and euthanizing the rabbits as they had been known to put athletes at risk in the playing fields and cause extensive damage to university grounds. Local veterinarians offered to perform neutering of the male rabbits. As of July 2011, the UVic campus is free of rabbits. 900 rabbits were saved and sent to shelters. The majority of rabbits moved to shelters died between 2011 and 2016, after which the remaining survivors (147 rabbits) were relocated to a private sanctuary in Alberta.

Libraries and museum

The University of Victoria Libraries system is the second largest in British Columbia, composed of three 'on-campus' libraries: the William C. Mearns Center for Learning/McPherson Library, the Diana M. Priestly Law Library, and the MacLaurin Curriculum Library. The Library System has undergone significant growth in recent years thanks to the university's investment in library purchases and research. Amongst the highlights in the University of Victoria Archives and Special Collections are items from Imperial Japan and carbon-dated original manuscripts of the Sancti Epiphanii. The collection also includes extensive histories of colonial Victoria and the Colony of Vancouver Island among other documents. The library's digitization programme is becoming increasingly active in making materials available. Renovations and new construction over the past decade have included special collections classrooms, an innovative Learning Commons and an art gallery. The UVic libraries collection includes extensive digital resources, over 2.0 million books, 2.3 million items in microforms, plus serial subscriptions, sound recordings, music scores, films and videos, and archival materials.

The University of Victoria houses the Education Heritage Museum, which displays educational history artifacts in the main hallway of the MacLaurin Building. The collection consists of manuscripts, texts, photographs, audio-visual material, lesson plans, posters, bells, ink bottles, fountain pens, desks, maps, athletic clothing, photographs, and school yearbooks used in kindergarten to grade 12 schools in Canada from the mid-1800s to the 1980s.

The University of Victoria has two art collections (University and Maltwood) which host loan exhibitions and exhibit students and faculty works in the University Centre Exhibition Gallery. The University Collection, founded in 1953 by Dr. W.H. Hickman, Principal of Victoria College (1953-1963), consists of 6,000 works, mainly by contemporary artists practicing in British Columbia. The Maltwood Art Museum and Gallery, founded through the bequest of English sculptress and antiquarian, Katharine Emma Maltwood, F.R.S.A. (1878-1961), reflects her and her husband John Maltwood's taste. The collection of 12,000 works of fine, decorative and applied arts includes Oriental ceramics, costumes, rugs, seventeenth century English furniture, Canadian paintings and Katherine Maltwood's own sculptures.

Transgender Archives

The Transgender Archives are a part of the University of Victoria Libraries and are committed to preserving the histories of pioneering activists, community leaders, and researchers who have made contributions to the betterment of trans, non-binary, and two-spirit people.

Since 2007, the Transgender Archives has actively collected documents, rare publications, and memorabilia of organizations or persons that had a hand in activism by and for trans, non-binary, and two-spirit people. The Transgender Archives are free and accessible to the public and can be found at the University of Victoria's main campus at the Mearns Centre for Learning- McPherson Library.

The Transgender Archives are the largest in the world, and were rated in the top 12 Most Enlightening LGBTQ Museums in the World in 2019. The records are over 160 metres in distance and go back over 120 years, spanning 15 languages, 25 countries, and 6 continents

Collections of the Transgender Archives include the Rikki Swin Institute collection, the Reed Erickson, the University of Ulster Trans-Gender Archive collection, and the Zenith Foundation. The second edition of the Transgender Archives book, 'Foundations for the Future', was released in 2016 and is available for free online at the University of Victoria's Transgender Archives home page. The book is written by Founder and Academic Director of the Transgender Archives, Aaron Devor. With the support of Grants and Awards Librarian Christine Walde, it was published by the University of Victoria Libraries. The book focuses on the history of trans activism and research, and also includes information regarding the origin of the Transgender Archives as well as multiple examples from the collection. The book's first edition, which was released in 2014, was a 2015 Lambda Literacy Awards finalist in LGBT nonfiction. In the same year, the book finished first for best offset print book at the 2015 College and University Print Management Awards.

Some key members of the Transgender Archives include Aaron Devor, the university's Chair in Transgender Studies; Lara Wilson, a university archivist, director of special collections at the University of Victoria, and chairperson of the Canadian Council of Archives; and Michael Radmacher, Administrative Officer to the Chair in Transgender Studies. Wilson holds two master's degrees, one in Art History and Visual Studies from UVic and a second in Archival Studies from the University of British Columbia. Radmacher graduated with from UVic with his Master of Arts in Political Science  in 2010 and completed a Masters of Library and Information Science degree in 2016.

Off-campus facilities

The University of Victoria has acquired a portfolio of properties around Victoria, British Columbia, and across Vancouver Island. These include the Legacy Gallery in downtown Victoria, the University Club, the Inter-urban campus, a former Saanich-based lodge and retreat, the Swans Hotel and Restaurant complex, and the Queenswood Property. The large, partially forested Queenswood property has been proposed as a site of future expansion for the university.

In 2017, the University of Victoria announced plans to develop a downtown campus/accommodation centre in the historic area of Victoria, BC including accommodation for students and other facilities. The new downtown campus will be centered in buildings donated to the university and located around the historic Broad Street area, beside the old Bay Centre. The downtown development has been suggested as a possible future home for UVic's Peter B. Gustavson School of Business.

The UVic endowment (estimated at $374 million) and large private donations have allowed for the university's estate to continue growing and for facilities to be upgraded and expanded on an ongoing basis.

Administration
Below is a list of undergraduate faculties, departments, and schools within the University of Victoria system.
Education, which includes Education, Kinesiology, and Recreation and Health Education
Engineering and Computer Science, which includes Biomedical, Civil, Computer, Electrical, Mechanical, and Software Engineering, as well as Computer Science
Fine Arts, which includes the departments of History in Art, Music, Professional Writing, Theatre, Visual Arts, and Writing
Human & Social Development, which includes Child and Youth Care, Health Information Science, Indigenous Governance, Nursing, Public Administration, Public Health and Social Policy and Social Work
Humanities, which includes English, French and Francophone Studies, Gender Studies, Germanic Studies, Greek and Roman Studies, Hispanic and Italian Studies, History, Indigenous Studies, Latin American Studies, Linguistics, Medieval studies, Medieval Studies, Pacific and Asian Studies, Philosophy, Religion Culture and Society, and Slavic Studies
Law, which includes the Juris Doctor (J.D.) program  and Juris Indigenarum Doctor (JID)
Peter B. Gustavson School of Business, which includes Commerce 
Science, which includes the departments of Biochemistry and Microbiology, Biology, Chemistry, Earth and Ocean Sciences, Mathematics and Statistics, and Physics and Astronomy 
Social Sciences, which includes Anthropology, Economics, Environmental Studies, Geography, Political Science, Psychology, and Sociology 

UVic also offers a number of interdisciplinary undergraduate programs, including Applied Ethics, Arts of Canada, European Studies, Film Studies, Human Dimensions of Climate Change, Indigenous Studies, Latin American Studies, Social Justice Studies, and Technology and Society.

Peter B. Gustavson School of Business
The Peter B. Gustavson School of Business, formerly the Faculty of Business, was renamed following a donation by local entrepreneur Peter B. Gustavson. This business school offers a wide range of programs including the BCom, MBA and other business degrees, EQUIS and AACSB accredited. The program starts with two years of general studies (with five required classes) and then the 3rd and 4th year are business intensive. Three co-op work terms are also required.

MGB Program: The Peter B. Gustavson School of Business is also offering a program called the Master Of Global Business. This program is in partnership with Montpellier Business School (France) and Sungkyunkwan University (Korea). In September, The Peter B. Gustavson School of Business welcomes 35 students from 13 countries. The module mostly focuses on MBS courses such as Finance, Supply chain management, marketing etc.

Engineering and Computer Science
The Faculty of Engineering and Computer Science admits approximately 400 students into first-year programs each year. Students can specialize in the following disciplines: Biomedical Engineering, Civil Engineering, Computer Engineering, Computer Science, Electrical Engineering, Mechanical Engineering, and Software Engineering.

Fine Arts
The Faculty of Fine Arts splits into five different departments: Art History and Visual Studies, the School of Music, Theatre, Visual Arts and Writing. UVic's Department of Art History and Visual Studies has a long tradition of scholarship in the areas of Islamic art, South and Southeast Asian art, and Native arts of North America. It is one of few schools that has traditionally held two chairs of Islamic art, most recently filled by Anthony Welch and Marcus Milwright. Esi Edugyan, two-time winner of the Giller Prize, is a graduate of the creative writing program

Humanities
The Faculty of Humanities consists of ten departments (English, French, Gender Studies, Germanic & Slavic Studies, Greek & Roman Studies, Hispanic & Italian Studies, History, Linguistics, Pacific & Asian Studies, and Philosophy) and three Programs (Latin American Studies, Medieval Studies, and Religious Studies). The faculty offers certificates, minors, and majors leading to both BA and BSc degrees, as well as MA and PhD degrees. Languages, narratives, philosophies, histories—the Faculty of Humanities brings these all together in a critical context of analysis, interpretation, research, and communication.

Law

The University of Victoria is home to Canada's first and only Indigenous Law degree program along with dedicated research centers for Indigenous and Environmental law. The Faculty of Law was instrumental in the establishment of the Akitsiraq Law School by founding its first class in Iqualit, Nunavat. Along with The University of British Columbia and Simon Fraser University, UVic jointly founded and co-operates TRIUMF, Canada's national laboratory for particle and nuclear physics, which houses the world's largest cyclotron. Altogether UVic operates nine academic faculties and schools including the Faculty of Law and Peter B. Gustavson School of Business. The University of Victoria Faculty of Law features a course at Hakia Beach, BC in association with the Tula Foundation.

School of Earth & Ocean Sciences

UVic hosts Ocean Networks Canada's deep-water seafloor research observatories VENUS and NEPTUNE, the Pacific Institute for Climate Solutions, and two Environment Canada labs: the Canadian Center for Climate Modelling and Analysis and the Water and Climate Impacts Research Centre. The Ocean Climate Building housed at the Queenswood location is dedicated solely to ocean and climate research. The Institute of Integrated Energy Systems is a leading center for research on sustainable energy solutions and alternative energy sources. 
The university was a founding member of the Western Canadian Universities Marine Sciences Society. UVic maintains this field station on the west coast of Vancouver Island, which is jointly run by the University of British Columbia, Simon Fraser University, the University of Alberta and the University of Calgary.

School of Public Administration
The UVic School of Public Administration specializes in its M.P.A. and PhD. programs but also offers a selective admission minors program for political leaders and mid-career civil servants.

Continuing Studies
Continuing education has been an integral part of the University of Victoria since its inception in 1963. Today, the Division of Continuing Studies provides adult and continuing education programming in co-operation with UVic faculties and community partners. The Division of Continuing Studies offers a comprehensive portfolio of programs in a range of academic disciplines, using diploma, certificate and other programming models to serve adult, part-time and internationally dispersed students.

Graduate programs
UVic is one of Canada's largest graduate schools, offering more than 160 graduate programs across the university's faculties and departments. Their most popular graduate degrees are in the following areas:
Business, The Gill School of Business. The UVic Gill Business School is known for its particular focus on International Business and Energy.
Political Science, includes a multi-disciplinary approach involving Economics, Geography, and Law.
Education, which includes Curriculum and Instruction, Educational Psychology & Leadership Studies, Exercise Science, Physical & Health Education, and Indigenous Education
Social Sciences, which includes Economics, Environmental Studies, Geography, Anthropology, Psychology, and Sociology
Engineering, which includes Computer Science, Electrical and Computer Engineering, Mechanical Engineering, and Software Engineering.
Fine Arts, which includes Art History & Visual Studies, the School of Music, Theatre, Visual Arts, and Writing
Humanities, which includes English, French, Germanic and Slavic Studies, Greek and Roman Studies, Hispanic and Italian Studies, History, Linguistics, Pacific and Asian Studies, and Philosophy. The history department has a reputation for Digital History.
Human and Social Development, which includes Child and Youth Care, Community Development, Dispute Resolution, Health Information Science, Indigenous Governance, Nursing, Public Administration, Public Health and Social Policy, Studies in Policy and Practice, Social Dimensions of Health, and Social Work
Science, which includes Biochemistry and Microbiology, Biology, Chemistry, Earth and Ocean Sciences, Mathematics and Statistics, Neuroscience, and Physics and Astronomy
Law
UVic's Graduate programs range from individual interdisciplinary programs to graduate research programs. The university also offers students specialized degree options and doctoral options.

Academic profile

Admissions
Admission to the University of Victoria is based on a selective academic system and is highly competitive. Each year, the university receives far more applications than there are spaces available, making it one of the most applied to institutions in Canada. Applicants are required to submit applications with their grade points average (GPA) and personal statements in order to be considered for admission. The university may also accept qualified applicants studying under IB programs, AP programs or other international distinctions. Given its endowment, the University of Victoria is able to offer scholarships and financial aid to a large number of students.

International exchanges
The University of Victoria has partnered with a number of research institutions to provide UVic students with the opportunity to gain research experience abroad. International conferences and study abroad opportunities are encouraged for all students, with many students completing a gap year before commencing their studies. Both UVic undergraduate and graduate students may travel abroad with UVic's many partner universities.

The University of Victoria has partnered with institutions around the world, including Sciences Po, University of London, University of Washington, Hong Kong University, Utrecht University, and the National University of Singapore.

Reputation

The University of Victoria has ranked in a number of post-secondary rankings. In the 2022 Academic Ranking of World Universities rankings, the university ranked 301–400 in the world and 13–17 in Canada. The 2023 QS World University Rankings ranked the university 359th in the world, and fourteenth in Canada. The 2023 Times Higher Education World University Rankings ranked the university 301–350 in the world, and 14–15 in Canada. In the 2022–23 U.S. News & World Report Best Global University Ranking, the university ranked 327th in the world, and 13th in Canada. The Canadian-based Maclean's magazine ranked the University of Victoria second in their 2023 Canadian comprehensive university category.

Along with academic and research-based rankings, the university has also been ranked by publications that evaluate the employment prospects of its graduates. In the Times Higher Education's 2022 global employability ranking, the university ranked 183rd in the world, and seventh in Canada. In QS's 2022 graduate employability ranking, the university ranked 301–500 in the world, and 10–17 in Canada.

Research
In 2018, Research Infosource named the University of Victoria the 19th best research university, with a sponsored research income of $114.922 million, and an average research income of $170,000 per faculty member in 2017.

The university's research performance has been noted in several bibliometric university rankings, which uses citation analysis to evaluate the impact a university has on academic publications. In 2019, the Performance Ranking of Scientific Papers for World Universities ranked the university 374th in the world, and 15th in Canada. The University Ranking by Academic Performance 2018–19 rankings placed the university 370th in the world, and 17th in Canada.

Research facilities operated by the University of Victoria include:

Bamfield Marine Research Station
The university maintains a field station on the west coast of Vancouver Island to conduct marine research. The facility is jointly run by the University of British Columbia, Simon Fraser University, the University of Alberta and the University of Calgary. Undergraduates at the University of Victoria have full access to research and learning at this facility.
SEOS Oceanic Vessel
In 2011 the university, in collaboration with the provincial government purchased and modified a state of the art ocean vessel capable of launching 'deep sea submersibles' and conducting long-range marine biology research expeditions. The 'floating laboratory' is undergoing upgrades and expansions currently and was scheduled to be in service by late 2011.

VENUS/NEPTUNE
The School of Earth & Ocean Sciences is also home to the VENUS and NEPTUNE research institutes responsible for seismic, oceanic and climate change research.
Centre for Law
Located in the Greater Victoria area the university's legal centre provides free legal assistance to the disadvantaged as well as dealing with important environmental cases in British Columbia. The UVic Law Center is the only full-time, term clinical program offered by a Canadian law school. The program reflects the faculty's emphasis on integrating legal theory, legal skills, and community service while providing students with unique education and research opportunities.
Vancouver Island Technology Park (VITP)
Located in the Greater Victoria area the Vancouver Island Technology Park is a state of the art, 35 acre commercial research facility. It is the largest university-owned technology centre in BC. The venture allows the university to work with leading technology and biomedical companies while provided students with unparalleled research opportunities. The facility focuses on fuel cell, new media, wireless, and life science/biotechnological research. The UVic Genome BC Proteomics Centre and a number of other research institutes are based out of the research park. The Capital Regional District is a major commercial hub for technology companies.

Culture and student life

Greek life
Several fraternities, sororities, and secret societies exist on the University of Victoria, despite the fact that the Students' Society does not recognize fraternities, sororities, or societies on the basis that they, by definition, seek to exclude portions of the membership. This issue was once a topic of debate in student politics at the University of Victoria in 2010.

Many years ago, University of Victoria students started a fraternity, two sororities and one non-exclusive, non-profit social-service club. Although the fraternities and sororities have no affiliation with the University of Victoria itself, they continue to thrive and have purchased nearby properties. The fraternities and sororities on campus are as follows:
The international fraternity Delta Kappa Epsilon chartered the Beta Tau chapter in 2010, currently estimated at 150 members.
The international sorority Kappa Beta Gamma chartered a chapter in 2011, currently estimated at 100 members.
The local sorority, Alpha Chi Theta, was chartered in 2013, and is currently estimated at 55 members.
The Omega chapter of Phrateres was installed in 1961.

Radio station (CFUV)
CFUV is a long-standing campus radio station focusing on the campus and the surrounding community. CFUV serves Greater Victoria at 101.9, and via cable on 104.3, Vancouver Island and many areas in the Lower Mainland and northwestern Washington state.

Residence halls

The University of Victoria maintains several residence halls on campus, which were originally based on the Oxbridge Collegiate model of constituent colleges which serve as a smaller, more personal home environment to the students of the wider university. The university no longer operates these halls as individual colleges, but rather as halls of residences (as well as dormitories and apartments) as part of the Residence Life and Education department. Today, all halls of residence are equipped with Common Rooms and high-speed internet for students. Most UVic students live on campus or within a few blocks of the main site.

The oldest and most famous of these residence halls is Craigdarroch, which features large stone-clad buildings and ivy covered walkways and courtyards. The modernist Lansdowne Halls feature six buildings connected by a series of bridges, walkways, and tunnels, including the popular 'UVic Underground'. Gordon Head and Ring Road Hall feature rooms and amenities for students, organized around a series of large courtyards.

In the centre of the Residence Village is the Cadboro Commons and a number of restaurants operated by the university, where students may eat and study. A mixture of dorms, single rooms, apartments, cluster studios, and family housing are available but decided by lottery system. First year students are guaranteed accommodation in one of the Residence Halls of campus.

Student newspaper
UVic's oldest and most recognized weekly student newspaper, founded in 1948, is The Martlet. It is distributed all over campus and the Greater Victoria area. The paper is named after the legendary martlet bird, whose inability to land is often seen to symbolize the constant quest for knowledge, learning, and adventure. The Martlet is partly funded by student fees. The Martlet is the only independent campus newspaper at the University of Victoria, and therefore one of the only publications that has the time and resources to fully hold both the University of Victoria and the University of Victoria Students' Society (UVSS) accountable. The Martlet regularly reports on UVic Board of Governors and Senate meetings, as well as University of Victoria Students' Society Board meetings and elections.

Today, The Martlet has a wide circulation and can be found in coffee shops, theatres, grocery stores, offices, and street corners throughout Victoria, British Columbia. The newspaper maintains its strong editorial line and commitment to politics and activism. Many national journalists and columnists in Canada have gotten their start in writing journalism at The Martlet and it continues to produce opportunities for student writers to become professionals. Notable Martlet alumni include Andrew MacLeod of the Tyee, Victoria Mayor Lisa Helps, and Leader of the B.C. Green Party Andrew Weaver.

In recent years, The Martlet has broken stories about UVSS spending deficits, UVic's reputational enhancement project, divestment lobbying efforts by UVic student activists, issues with UVic's sexualized violence policy, the arrival of Starbucks on campus, problems in the UVic Sociology department, international student tuition hikes, student groups' support of the Unist'ot'en First Nation camp, pro-life vs. pro-choice protesters on campus, racism and antisemitism on campus, and the ongoing battle for UVic student Lilia Zaharieva to receive her life-saving medication for her cystic fibrosis.

The Martlet is written and published on the unceded lands of the Lekwungen peoples, and the Songhees, Esquimalt, and W̱SÁNEĆ peoples.

Martlet stories are regularly picked up by larger publications including the CBC, CTV News, the Times Colonist, and Chek News.

University traditions, myths, lore

Cadborosaurus
Cadborosaurus is a mythical sea serpent in the folklore of regions of the Pacific Coast of North America that is rumored by students to live in Cadboro Bay, adjacent to the University of Victoria. The Cadborosaurus, or 'Caddy' as he is colloquially named, has become a favourite for students.

Fight song
Notable among a number of songs commonly played and sung at various events such as commencement and convocation, and athletic games, is 'Rack and Ruin', a reminder of the tradition of the founding Victoria College.

"Rack and Ruin,
Blood and Gore,
Victoria College
Evermore!"

Finnerty Gardens
UVic maintains an extensive series of gardens on campus which serve as a place of respite and peace for students, staff, and members of the public who visit them. The Garden's include some of the largest collections of West-Coast plants and are cared for by the Friends of Finnerty Gardens, a charity which raises funds and helps support the garden's growth. The Finnerty Gardens include ponds, trails, flower gardens, and benches throughout. The University Multi-Faith Centre is nestled neared the gardens.

Martlet icon
The martlet and its red colour adorn many parts of the University of Victoria, including the crest, coat of arms, and flag representing the university's previous affiliation to McGill University which also uses the martlet. The legendary martlet bird's inability to land is often seen to symbolize the constant quest for knowledge, learning, and adventure. The oldest student newspaper on campus, The Martlet, is named after the bird.

Weeks of Welcome
UVic Orientation/Weeks of Welcome takes place each year for all new students to the school. UVic Orientation includes events, activities, and workshops to help students adjust to university life. The main event of UVic Orientation, which takes place on the day immediately preceding the first day of classes, has gone by a number of names over the years. This event is currently referred to as New Student Welcome, and is UVic's largest Orientation event.

University Club

The University Club of Victoria is a private club located on the campus of University of Victoria. Faculty, Staff, and students are all members of the club and outside organization may also use the dining halls, meeting rooms, and other facilities. Alumni of the university often become members as well. The catering staff host dinners and awards celebrations frequently and the Holiday Roast Pig is a classic event on campus.

The University Club (formerly called the Faculty Club) opened on March 16, 1982. The building, located on campus, is surrounded by high trees in a quiet, wooded area.

The University of Victoria Students Society (UVSS)
The University of Victoria Students' Society is the second largest student society in British Columbia and represents the UVic undergraduate student body, plans campus wide events and operates the Student Union Building. The student society's leadership is elected annually during campus wide undergraduate student elections. As a multimillion-dollar organization, the UVSS is one of the larger student unions which exist in Canada. The UVSS also negotiates with local government and healthcare providers for Student Transit Passes and health insurance.

In 2014, the UVSS Student Union building underwent a major overhaul and renovation. In 2015, the university expanded and doubled the capacity of the public transit hub on campus which is adjacent to the Student Union building.

In 2016, plans began for the fundraising and building of a new, much larger Student Union Building to accommodate the growing student population.

The University of Victoria Graduate Student Society (GSS)
The University of Victoria has one of the highest percentages of graduate and doctoral students in the country. The GSS offers services and academic support for UVic's 3,000 Graduate students. The society's services include the Grad House Restaurant, health and dental plan, funding for grad student events, and reduced-cost membership in the Victoria Car Share Co-operative.

Athletics

The Victoria Vikes (more commonly known as Vikes Nation) represent the university in a number of competitive sports, including rowing, swimming, rugby, and basketball. The Vikes have especially long ties to competitive rowing having competed for several international titles. Sailing remains an important sport at the university and the UVic Sailing Club (UVSC) maintains training facilities and boats at the nearby Cadboro Bay.

Significant endowments, scholarships, and bursaries allow the university to recruit the best student-athletes, regardless of financial standing. UVic is a participating partner in the Canada West Universities Athletic Association (CWUAA) (the western division of ) and in the National Association of Intercollegiate Athletics (NAIA). Basketball games were traditionally played in the 2,500 seat, McKinnon Gymnasium which was built in 1975.

An athletics facility was completed in 2015, which provides considerably more space and facilities for athletics. The $77 million Centre for Athletes, Recreation, and Special Abilities (CARSA), opened its doors on May 4, 2015.

The university currently has both men's and women's teams in each of the following sports:

Rowing
Sailing
Basketball
Cross country & track
Field hockey
Golf
Rugby
Soccer
Swimming

Rowing
UVic maintains a boathouse on Elk Lake in Victoria, British Columbia.

UVic and UBC rivalry

As the two oldest universities in the province, the University of Victoria (UVic) and the University of British Columbia (UBC) have long been fierce rivals in sports and athletics, including in Rowing, Rugby, and Soccer. The UVic Vikes and UBC Thunderbirds rivalry is a symbol of good sportsmanship, but has sometimes resulted in violence and less-than-polite behaviour  by both sides. The "Annual UBC I UVic Soccer Classic" is one of the largest university sporting events in Canada and pits the UBC Men's Soccer Team against the UVic Men's Soccer Team. The annual classic alternates between the UVic Centennial Stadium and the UBC Thunderbird Stadium.

Vikes Nation fans and UBC Thunderbird fans pack into the Centennial stadium for the classic, with the UVic Cheerleaders and Marching Band also present. In 2015, UVic also constructed a new and expanded Athletics Facility (CARSA) which includes a major auditorium/gymnasium for Vikes Basketball Teams, and significantly more seating, stands, and court facilities.

Centennial Stadium

The Centennial Stadium is a historic stadium located on the campus of the University of Victoria in Victoria, British Columbia, Canada. The large facility was built as a 1967 Canadian Centennial project to celebrate the 100th anniversary of Canadian confederation, but has undergone many repairs and upgrades since then. Today, it is one of the largest university stadiums in British Columbia and is home to the UVic Vikes.

Sports Hall of Fame
UVic Charter Inductees are:

Lorne Loomer: Rowing Coach – Builder/Administrator
Wally Milligan: Men's Soccer Coach – Builder/Administrator
Gareth Rees: Rugby – Athlete Category
Ken Shields: Basketball – Coach Category
Kathy Shields: Basketball – Coach Category
Johnny Franklin: water polo (All-Star)- Athlete Category (50in'15)
 Championships
Men's basketball: 1980, 1981, 1982, 1983, 1984, 1985, 1986, 1997
Women's basketball: 1980, 1981, 1982, 1985, 1987, 1992, 1998, 2000, 2003
Men's cross-country: 1995, 1996, 1997, 1998, 2015
Women's cross-country: 1981, 1986, 1987, 1988, 1995, 1999, 2000, 2001, 2002
Women's field hockey: 1985, 1988, 1990, 1992, 1993, 1995, 1996, 1998, 2001, 2003, 2008, 2018, 2019, 2021
Men's soccer: 1976, 1988, 1997, 2004, 2011
Women's soccer: 2005

Canadian University Championship Titles
Men's rugby: 1998, 1999, 2020
Men's rowing: 1997, 1998, 2000, 2001, 2009, 2010, 2021
Women's rowing: 1997, 1998, 1999, 2000, 2001, 2002, 2003, 2005, 2010, 2011, 2012, 2022
Men's golf: 2003, 2005, 2006

Canadian Western Universities Championship Titles
Women's field hockey: 2015

Sport clubs and societies
UVic has 25 sport clubs that are administered by Vikes Recreation and run by students.

People

Chancellors

Presidents

Notable faculty
Some of the university's noted faculty members, past and present, are:

Alan Astbury, physics professor emeritus who played a part in the Nobel-prize winning discovery of a new subatomic particle and winner of the Rutherford Medal and Prize for physics
Taiaiake Alfred, noted Indigenous scholar and founding director of the Indigenous Governance Program at UVic
Mowry Baden, sculptor and winner of the 2008 Governor General's Award in Visual Arts
David D. Balam, astronomer and namesake of asteroid 3749 Balam 
Brendan Burke, Aegean Bronze Age archaeologist
Benjamin Butterfield, internationally acclaimed operatic tenor
Brian Christie, Associate professor of Medicine and Neuroscience and active researcher
Louis D. Costa, neuropsychologist
Ronald I. Cheffins, professor emeritus of law and political science, first lawyer to be appointed directly to the British Columbia court of appeal (1985), a Canadian Constitutional expert, advisor to five past British Columbia lieutenant-governors, Vice-chair on the Law Reform Commission of British Columbia (1991), special commissioner appointed by Lieutenant-Governor Clarence Wallace (1953)
Harold Coward, world-renowned scholar in religious studies and a president of Academy 2 of the Royal Society of Canada
Lorna Crozier, recent recipient of the Order of Canada
Aaron H. Devor, sociologist and sexologist known for transgender research and holder of the university's Research Chair in Transgender Studies, a world's first
William Gaddes, noted psychologist and one of the first specialists in learning disorders in British Columbia
Werner Israel, physicist who discovered the important phenomenon of mass inflation, and together with Stephen Hawking, coeditor of two important celebratory volumes
Stephen Arthur Jennings, mathematician who made significant breakthroughs in the study of modular representation theory
Mary Kerr, production designer for the 1994 Commonwealth Games opening and closing ceremonies
Boualem Khouider, mathematician and climate scientist
Patrick Lane, poet and the recipient of almost every major Canadian literary prize
Hal Lawrence, World War II veteran and historian
Tim Lilburn, poet and winner of the Governor General's Award
Stephen Lindsay, cognitive psychologist in the field of memory
Joan MacLeod, playwright and creative writing professor
Marshall McCall, scientist and expert on the chemical evolution of galaxies
Giselle O. Martin-Kniep, educator focusing on learning communities
Erich Mohr, researcher in experimental therapeutics for central nervous system disorders
Julio Navarro, astrophysicist involved in formulating a density profile for dark matter halos
Jesse Read, musical conductor, composer, and bassoonist 
Jillian Roberts, child psychologist and children's book author
Otfried Spreen, neuropsychologist and aphasia researcher
James Tully, Distinguished Professor Emeritus of Political Science, Law, Indigenous Governance and Philosophy 
Don VandenBerg, internationally acclaimed astrophysicist for his work on modelling stars
Kim Venn, professor of physics & astronomy and director of the Astronomy Research Centre who has made significant contributions to the field of stellar spectroscopy
Andrew Weaver, one of the world's leading climate researchers, member of the UN Intergovernmental Panel on Climate Change which was co-awarded the 2007 Nobel Peace Prize along with former U.S. vice president Al Gore, member of the British Columbia Climate Action Team, MLA for Oak Bay-Gordon Head from 2013 to 2020 and Leader of the BC Green Party from 2015 to 2020.
Anthony Welch, art historian and one of the foremost authorities on Islamic art & architecture
Christine Welsh, Métis filmmaker
Jin-Sun Yoon, 2015 recipient of 3M National Teaching Award
Anne Zeller, physical anthropologist specializing in the study of primates
Chase Joynt, joined the University of Victoria in 2019 as an assistant professor of Gender Studies. He teaches three courses; Queer Cinema, Popular Culture and Social Media, and Gender, Power and Difference. According to the University of Victoria undergraduate calendar - January 2021, GNDR 344 - Queer Film surveys "queer" representation in popular film. Particular attention is paid to critical analyses of gay, lesbian, straight, queer, transgender and transsexual embodiment on the screen. According to the University of Victoria undergraduate calendar - January 2021, GNDR 200 - Popular Culture and Social Media critically examines representations of gender, race, class and sexualities in popular culture and social media with a consideration of how historical, ideological, social and political forces influence media practices. According to the University of Victoria undergraduate calendar - January 2021, GNDR 100 - Gender, Power, and Difference is an interdisciplinary introduction to gender studies. Considers the way gender (i.e., our idea of what it is to be a "real" woman or man) is constructed across class, race/ethnicity, sexualities, (dis)abilities, age and geographical location. Examines the impact of these intersecting identities on social inequality through diverse topics, such as media, culture, language, work, health, globalization, colonization and activism. Situates Canadian topics in a broader, transnational context, emphasizing connections between the "local" and the "global."
Thea Cacchioni, currently an associate professor and chair of the gender studies department at the University of Victoria. Her research focuses on the medicalization of sex, gender, and sexuality; as well as specifically focussing on specific diagnoses such as Female Sexual Dysfunction and Polycystic Ovarian Syndrome. Cacchioni has testified twice at the US Federal Food and Drug Administration against 'pink viagra,' an ineffective desire drug designed for women with harmful side effects.
Sikata Banerjee, is a Gender Studies professor who joined the University of Victoria in 2000. Banerjee offers six courses including; Gender Studies Seminar, Women, Race and Empire, Imagining India from Empire to Bollywood, Masculinities, Women in Contemporary India, and Gender, Nation, and War.
Annalee Lepp, an associate professor in the Gender Studies Department at the University of Victoria since 1993. Lepp teaches four courses which include; GNDR 201 - Gender, Food and Power, GNDR 302 - Sex Work, Trafficking and Human Rights, GNDR 400A - Critical Research Practices, and GNDR 400B - Research Seminar for Independent Project.
Andrea Walsh is an associate professor and Smyth chair in Arts & Engagement at the University of Victoria and a curator. Dr. Walsh is a visual anthropologist, specialized in 20th-century contemporary aboriginal and visual culture in Canada. Since 2011 Walsh has been the director of the Visiting Arts Program out of the Department of Anthropology as part of one of her courses; as well as teaching a course on museums and anthropology. She has been a curator in eight different exhibitions since 2000. Walsh's most recent exhibition, also curated by Dr. Sharon Fortney, "There is Truth Here: Creativity and Resilience in Children's Art from Indian Residential and Day Schools," featured surviving artwork attained from residential and day schools from several different places across Canada; this was featured in the Museum of Vancouver. This exhibit was part of her work as an Honorary Witness to Canada's Truth and Reconciliation Commission. For her work on this exhibit in partnership with the survivors of the residential and Day Schools in Canada, she received a Community Award in 2020 from the BC Achievement Foundation.
Christine Sy is an Ojibway Anishinaabe professor of Gender Studies at the University of Victoria (British Columbia) from Bawatig (Sault Ste. Marie, ON). Sy is from obiishkikaang Lac Seul First Nation in Ontario, and is makwa odoodem meaning Bear Clan. Sy also has ancestry from north of Sault St. Marie, Ontario, in Island Lake. In 2016, Sy began as a lecturer at the University of Victoria, and in 2018, became an assistant professor. Sy's teaching and research specializes in Indigenous gender studies, and the relationship between Indigenous peoples and the land, and the politics surrounding their ongoing relationship with the more-than-natural world. Sy's recent research centres the sovereignty of the Anishinaabeg peoples, and uses feminist interpretive lenses to examine the relationships of Anishinaabeg women with the sugar bush across space and time. Sy holds her relationship with the Lekwungen and WSÁNEĆ lands, waters and peoples as a priority, as well as her relationship with her own nation in her research, her education and in her creative life.

Notable alumni
The university has over 88,000 alumni. As of 2020, 7 Guggenheim Fellows, 3 Killiam Prize winners, 14 members of the Order of Canada, 11 Rhodes Scholars and 43 Fellows of the Royal Society of Canada have been affiliated with the university. Listed below are some of UVic's noted alumni:

Alumni in the arts
Kim Adams, internationally known sculptor
Bill Burns, conceptual artist
Mark Chao, Chinese/Taiwanese singer, actor and model
Calvin Chen, singer and actor as a member in the popular Taiwanese boy band Fahrenheit
Kyle Christie Journalist
Esi Edugyan, novelist
Nathan Fielder, writer and comedian
Leah Gibson, actress
Rick Gibson, sculptor and performance artist
Lori Hallier, actress
Aislinn Hunter, poet and fiction author
Erin Karpluk, actress currently starring as Erica Strange on CBC's Being Erica
W. P. Kinsella, novelist well known for his 1982 novel Shoeless Joe which was adapted into the movie Field of Dreams
Eva Markvoort, author who chronicled her life with cystic fibrosis which became the subject of the film '65 Redroses
Aaron McArthur, Global News BC television reporter
Charles Montgomery, writer
Janet Munsil, playwright and theatre director
Peter Outerbridge, Genie-nominated actor in such movies as Kissed and Saw VI
Nilesh Patel, noted filmmaker
Chris Perry, Royal Canadian Navy Historian
Eden Robinson, novelist and short story writer 
Tina Ross, noted archaeological illustrator working in the Aegean area
Melanie Siebert, poet
Bren Simmers, poet
Jessica Stockholder, artist
Richard Van Camp, short story writer and novelist
D.W. Wilson, writer

Alumni in business
Stewart Butterfield (B.A. '96), entrepreneur, businessman, co-founder of the photo sharing website Flickr and its parent company Ludicorp; founded the team communication app Slack
Peter Ciceri, former vice-president, Compaq Computer Corporation, United States
Bob Cummings, Executive Vice-president, Guest Experience and Marketing of WestJet
Richard Flury, former chief executive of BP
Mark Hill, co-founder and former vice-president of WestJet
Ryan Holmes, founder and CEO of the online social media dashboard, Hootsuite
Jeff Mallett, former president and chief operating officer of Yahoo!
Tim Price, chair and director of Trilon Financial Corporation
Sheridan Scott, vice-president of Bell Canada; former head of the Competition Bureau of Canada
Benjamin Philip George, Executive Director & Chief Executive Officer of George Healthcare Berhad
Alistair Vigier, chief executive officer and co-founder of ClearWay Law 
Kyle Vucko, chief executive officer and co-founder of Indochino

Alumni in government and public affairs
George Abbott, former BC Liberal cabinet Minister and member of the Legislative Assembly of British Columbia for Shuswap.
Rona Ambrose, Interim leader of the Conservative Party and Leader of the Opposition, and federal cabinet Minister under Stephen Harper.
Jody Wilson-Raybould, former Liberal Minister of Justice and Attorney General of Canada and current MP for Vancouver Granville. She was Canada's first Indigenous Minister of Justice.
Russell Brown
Emmanuel Brunet-Jailly, public policy scholar and editor of the Journal of Borderlands Studies
Ric Careless, one of British Columbia's leaders in wilderness preservation, named Environmentalist of the Year (1991) by Equinox Magazine and River Conservationist of the Year (1993) by American Rivers
Murray Coell, former BC Liberal cabinet Minister and member of the Legislative Assembly of British Columbia for Saanich North and the Islands and former mayor of Saanich. 
Fin Donnelly, former NDP Member of Parliament for New Westminster-Coquitlam and current member of the Legislative Assembly of British Columbia for Coquitlam-Burke Mountain.
Rob Fleming, NDP provincial cabinet Minister and member of the Legislative Assembly of British Columbia for Victoria-Swan Lake.
Barbara Hall, mayor of Toronto (1994–1997)
Colin Hansen, former BC Liberal Member of the Legislative Assembly of British Columbia for Vancouver-Quilchena. 
Lydia Hwitsun, former Chief of Cowichan Tribes
Judi Tyabji, former BC Liberal member of the Legislative Assembly of British Columbia for Okanagan-East.
Gary Lunn, former Conservative federal Minister, former Member of Parliament for Saanich-Gulf Islands.
Lorna Marsden, former president of York University
Rabbie Namaliu, Prime Minister of Papua New Guinea (1988-1992)
Adrian Norfolk, Ambassador of Canada to Qatar
Barry Penner, former BC Liberal provincial cabinet minister and member of the Legislative Assembly of British Columbia for Chilliwack-Hope and former president of the Pacific Northwest Economic Region (PNWER).
Andrew Petter, Canadian constitutional law scholar, former NDP Attorney-General of British Columbia and member of the Legislative Assembly of British Columbia for Saanich South, and current president of Simon Fraser University
Carla Qualtrough, Liberal Member of Parliament for Delta and federal Minister.
Tamara Vrooman, former Deputy Minister of Finance of British Columbia and current Vancity CEO

Alumni in the sciences
Laurel Schafer, Canada Research Chair in Catalyst Development
Robert Campbell Aitken, a Fellow of the Institute of Electrical and Electronics Engineers
Trevor Van Damme, Aegean archaeologist

Alumni in sports
Kirsten Barnes, winner of two Olympic gold medals in rowing in 1992 in Barcelona
Ryan Cochrane, 2008 Olympic bronze medalist in men's 1500m freestyle swimming, and 2012 Olympic silver medalist in 1500m freestyle swimming
Stephanie Dixon, swimmer, gold medalist in the Paralympic Games in Athens (2004) and Sydney (2000), and numerous medals in the Pan American Games
Kyle Hamilton, gold medalist at the 2008 Summer Olympics in men's eights in rowing
Sarah Kaufman, former Strikeforce Women's Bantamweight Championship holder, professional mixed martial artist, formerly with the Ultimate Fighting Championship, current Invicta FC Bantamweight Champion
Gareth Rees, CEO for Rugby Canada and Canada's all-time leading goal scorer in rugby
Ken Shields, former head coach of the Canadian national basketball team
Alison Sydor, three-time world mountain bike champion and recipient of the Velma Springstead Trophy as Canada's top female athlete in 1995 and 1996
Lauren Woolstencroft, eight-time Paralympics gold medalist in alpine skiing

Asteroid 150145 Uvic
The asteroid 150145 Uvic was named in the university's honour on 1 June 2007. UVic was the first university in BC to have an asteroid named for it.

Coat of Arms

See also
Adaptive Public License
Akitsiraq Law School
Camosun College, a nearby college
Education in Canada
Higher education in British Columbia
List of universities in British Columbia
University of Victoria Students' Society

Notes

References

External links

 
 Official athletics website

 
1963 establishments in British Columbia
Educational institutions established in 1963
University of Victoria
Universities in British Columbia